Gandotinib (LY-2784544) is an experimental drug developed by Eli Lilly for treatment of cancer. It is a small molecule JAK2 (Janus kinase) inhibitor, with additional minor inhibition of STAT3.

In a phase I trial, 16% of patients receiving the drug developed tumor lysis syndrome. A phase II trial is underway for patients with myeloproliferative neoplasms, polycythemia vera, essential thrombocythemia, or myelofibrosis, who had failed ruxolitinib.

References 

Experimental cancer drugs
Pyrazoles
4-Morpholinyl compunds